Roger James Bennett (born 14 September 1970) is a British-American broadcaster, podcaster, and filmmaker. He hosts multiple podcasts and founded the Men in Blazers Media Network. In June 2021, Bennett released a memoir entitled Reborn in the USA: An Englishman's Love Letter to his Chosen Home which debuted at #1 on the New York Times Bestseller List.

Career

Men in Blazers

The podcast began on the Grantland network in 2011 and quickly established itself as the most popular football podcast in North America. Regular guests included Billy Beane, John Oliver, Andrew Luck, and bands like The National, Vampire Weekend, and Mumford and Sons, all of whom came on the show to discuss their footballing passions.

After becoming a cult hit on ESPN during the 2014 World Cup, the duo signed with NBCSN to create a weekly half-hour television show "Men in Blazers" which covers the English Premier League. It debuted on 15 September 2014, and is filmed in a studio in the SoHo area of New York City, which Bennett refers to as “The Panic Room.”

The show celebrates Premier League storylines week to week. Bennett interviews a celebrity in the final third of each episode. His guests have included Will Ferrell, Laura Linney, DeAndre Hopkins, Killer Mike, Rory McIlroy, Niall Horan, and Alex Morgan.

Other sports
Empowered by the popularity of the Men In Blazers football coverage, Bennett and Men In Blazers, along with his production partner, Jonathan Williamson, have gone on to create content on NFL, golf, where they cover the British Open and The Presidents Cup, and the NHL.

Men In Blazers on Ice
In 2019, Men in Blazers debuted Men in Blazers on Ice, where Bennett sat down with NHL stars to talk through their careers and the lessons they have learned along the way. The first season featured PK Subban and Alex Ovechkin. Season two premiered in the spring of 2020 and featured interviews with T.J. Oshie, Auston Matthews, Ryan O'Reilly, Tampa Bay Lightning coach Jon Cooper, and Victor Hedman.

Live tours
Every summer, Bennett and Davies tour the nation playing a stream of live tours which bring together footballing loving Americans in a theater setting with guests including Waka Flocka, Sam Darnold, and Julie Ertz. The tours were the subject of a "Real Sports" feature on HBO.

Films
Thanks to the popularity of Men In Blazers, Bennett has been invited by numerous teams to film with their managers and players. He has created television specials with José Mourinho, Pep Guardiola, Jurgen Klopp, Steve Kerr, Arsène Wenger, Mauricio Pochettino, Kevin De Bruyne, Harry Kane, Virgil van Dijk, and Wayne Rooney. In 2018, Bennett made a 3-part NBC Sports television story on the history of Liverpool F.C., entitled “In the Shadow of the Kop”.

The Promoted series
In 2017, Bennett launched an annual three-part television series on NBC, entitled ”The Promoted” where he visits the cities of every newly promoted Premier League teams to tell the story of their journey to the Premier League and the culture that surrounds the club. 2017's episodes were Newcastle United F.C., Brighton & Hove Albion F.C. and Huddersfield Town A.F.C. 2018 featured Wolverhampton Wanderers F.C., Cardiff City F.C., and Fulham F.C. 2019 had Norwich City F.C., Sheffield United F.C., and Aston Villa F.C. 2020 included Leeds United F.C. 2021 featured Brentford F.C.

Podcasts

American Fiasco
In 2018, Bennett partnered with WNYC to create American Fiasco, a 10-part series that followed the rise and fall of US Soccer's World Cup dreams in 1998, when the American squad believed that after successfully hosting the 1994 tournament, nothing could stop them from going to the next one and winning it all. The series was described as "part love letter to the American game, and part forensic accounting of the nation’s inability to fulfill its dreams in the global game." It reached Number One on iTunes in its debut week.

Wayne Rooney podcast
After Wayne Rooney filmed a Men in Blazers Special with Bennett, the duo went on to tape a regular monthly podcast, The Wayne Rooney Podcast whilst Rooney was in the United States.

HBO podcasts
In July 2020, Bennett produced and hosted an eight-part podcast series for HBO. Airing weekly, each episode featured an interview between Bennett and a member of the cast of Succession discussing the series in anticipation of its third season.

In September 2021, Bennett and HBO announced The Band of Brothers Podcast, a 12-part interview series in honor of the 20th anniversary of Band of Brothers. Episodes featured interviews with cast and crew members, including Tom Hanks, Damian Lewis, and Ron Livingston.

World Corrupt
In October 2022, Bennett partnered with Tommy Vietor of Crooked Media to produce a six-part podcast series tackling the corruption and human rights controversies surrounding the 2022 World Cup in Qatar.

The Women's Game
Bennett has taped films with US Women World Cup winners including Megan Rapinoe, Alex Morgan, Crystal Dunn, and Lindsey Horan. In April 2022, Bennett and Men in Blazers launched The Women's Game, a podcast dedicated to the National Women's Soccer League and the global women's game. Along with Bennett, the podcast features a rotating slate of current NWSL players as co-hosts. Season One co-hosts were Becky Sauerbrunn, Midge Purce, Megan Klingenberg, Andi Sullivan, Tierna Davidson, Alana Cook, and Nadia Nadim. The podcast also features interviews with a variety of guests, including San Diego Wave head coach Casey Stoney and Washington Spirit forward Trinity Rodman.

European Nights
In February 2022, Bennett launched European Nights, a podcast devoted to The Champion's League and European football, which Bennett co-hosts alongside the New York Times Chief Soccer Correspondent Rory Smith.

Tyler Adams: Road to the Cup
Beginning in April 2022, Bennett released a monthly 8-part podcast with Tyler Adams.

Go! Go! USA!
Ahead of the 2022 World Cup, Bennett released the podcast series Go! Go! USA! with Ted Lasso creator Brendan Hunt, chronicling the history of the US Men's National Team.

Books
Bennett has published books on a slew of eclectic topics including Bar Mitzvah Disco, a book on Bar Mitzvah photographs of the 1980s, which he wrote with his brother-in-law, Nick Kroll,Everything You Know is Pong, which he wrote with Eli Horowitz about table tennis. In June 2021, Bennett released a memoir entitled Reborn in the USA: An Englishman's Love Letter to his Chosen Home. It debuted at No. 1 on the New York Times Best Seller List. It was listed as one of Amazon's Best Nonfiction Books of Year in Nov. 2021. In 2022, he and Davies compiled a list of greatest international soccer players entitled Gods of Soccer: The Pantheon of the 100 Greatest Soccer Players (According To Us) ahead of the 2022 World Cup.

Other projects 
In 2010, he created the architectural design competition Sukkah City with journalist Joshua Foer. Bennett is also co-founder of a record label, Idelsohn Society for Musical Preservation, that has tracked down lost music from the 1950s and 60s and reissued it including BAGELS AND BONGOS and BLACK SABBATH. In 2018, he wrote an op-ed in the Washington Post about Wayne Rooney A lifelong fan of the Chicago White Sox, Bennett threw out the first pitch on August 29, 2019.

Personal life 
Bennett married Vanessa Kroll, daughter of Kroll Inc. founder Jules Kroll, in 2000. His brother-in-law is comedian Nick Kroll. Bennett is Jewish. In 2014, he announced he would be becoming a naturalized US citizen based upon the United States men's national soccer team's progress in the 2014 FIFA World Cup. Bennett became a US citizen on 1 June 2018. Bennett is a longtime supporter of Everton F.C. Bennett is also a fan of the Chicago Bears, the Chicago White Sox, and the Washington Capitals. He has a dog named Martin Scorsese.  He is fond of Tracy Chapman and tweed.

Bibliography 

 - Bar Mitzvah Disco
 - Camp Camp: Where Fantasy Island Meets Lord of the Flies
 - And You Shall Know Us By the Trail of Our Vinyl
 - The ESPN World Cup Companion
 - Everything you know is pong
 - Unscrolled
 - "Encyclopedia Blazertannica: A Suboptimal Guide to Soccer, America's "Sport of the Future" Since 1972"
 - Reborn in the USA: An Englishman's Love Letter to his Chosen Home

References

Further reading
NBC Sports talk

External links 

1970 births
Writers from Liverpool
English Jewish writers
English sports journalists
Living people
British emigrants to the United States
Jewish American writers
American sports journalists
American people of English-Jewish descent
English podcasters
Alumni of the University of Leeds
People educated at Liverpool College
21st-century American Jews